This is a partial list of bridges of Bangkok, Thailand.

Bridges over Chao Phraya River 

Bhumibol Bridge (2006), connecting Yan Nawa District, Bangkok, and Phra Pradaeng District, Samut Prakan
Rama IX Bridge (1987), a semi-symmetric cable-stayed bridge, connecting Rat Burana and Yan Nawa Districts, Bangkok
Krungthep Bridge (1959), connecting Thonburi and Bang Kho Laem Districts, Bangkok
Rama III Bridge (1999), connecting Thonburi and Bang Kho Laem Districts, Bangkok
Taksin Bridge (1982), connecting Khlong San, Bang Rak, and Sathon Districts, Bangkok
Phra Pok Klao Bridge (1984), connecting Phra Nakhon and Khlong San Districts, Bangkok
Memorial Bridge (1932), connecting Phra Nakhon and Thonburi Districts, Bangkok
Phra Pin Klao Bridge (1973), near the Grand Palace, connecting Phra Nakhon and Bangkok Noi Districts, Bangkok
MRT Blue Line tunnel (under construction), Near Phra Pin Klao Bridge
Rama VIII Bridge (2002), a single tower asymmetrical cable-stayed bridge, connecting Phra Nakhon and Bang Phlat Districts, Bangkok
Krung Thon Bridge (1958), also known as Sang Hi Bridge, connecting Dusit and Bang Phlat Districts, Bangkok
MRT Blue Line bridge (under construction)
Rama VI Bridge (1927), rail-road bridge of the southern line, connecting Bang Sue and Bang Phlat Districts, Bangkok
Light Red Line commuter railway bridge (under construction), running parallel to Rama VI Bridge
Rama VII Bridge (1992), connecting Bang Sue District, Bangkok, to Bang Kruai District, Nonthaburi

Other notable bridges 

Bang Na Expressway
Chaloem La 56 Bridge
Chamai Maruchet Bridge
Phan Phiphop Lila Bridge
Phan Fa Lilat Bridge
Mahatthai Uthit Bridge
Makkhawan Rangsan Bridge
Thewakam Rang Rak Bridge
Han Bridge
Iron Bridge
Orathai Bridge

Former bridges 
Chalerm Sawan 58 Bridge

 
Bangkok
Bridges, Bangkok
Bridges